Catherine McGourty is a camogie player, and winner of four Soaring Star awards in 2009, 2011, 2012 and 2014. She was a member of the 2001 Junior All-Ireland winning Down team. She represented Ireland in the 2008 shinty-camogie international. She captained the Down team in 2009 and plays for Ballycran.

References

Living people
Down camogie players
Year of birth missing (living people)